William Charles Winterton (2 June 1822 — 8 December 1898) was an English first-class cricketer.

Winterton was born at the Leicestershire village of Thurmaston in June 1822. He was an important figure in Cambridge cricket, making his debut in first-class cricket for the Cambridge Town Club against Cambridge University as 17–year old in 1839 at Parker's Piece. Winterton played first-class cricket over a period of 22 years, making 18 appearances. His opportunities in the Cambridge side had become lessened by the emergence of Daniel Hayward in the early 1850s. Playing as a wicket-keeper, he was described in James Pycroft's 1854 edition of The Cricket Field as a cricketer who "carries great weight with him at the wicket". In 18 first-class matches, Winterton scored 170 runs at an average of 7.39, with a highest score of 27. As a wicket-keeper he also made three stumpings. Winterton was also a useful right-arm roundarm fast bowler, taking 4 wickets in first-class cricket. He died in Leicestershire at Rothley in December 1898.

References

External links

1822 births
1898 deaths
People from the Borough of Charnwood
Cricketers from Leicestershire
English cricketers
Cambridge Town Club cricketers